Xenomigia caesura is a moth of the family Notodontidae. It is found in north-eastern Ecuador.

The length of the forewings is 13-16.5 mm. The ground colour of the forewings is light chocolate brown with orange-yellow veins. The wing base is dark brown. The hindwings are translucent light brown.

The larvae feed on Chusquea species.

Etymology
The species name is derived from Latin caesura (meaning a pause or break) and refers to the white mark arising from the forewing anal margin, which forms a narrow, transverse bar in most Xenomigia species but which is interrupted along the anal fold to form two small, white spots in X. caesura.

References

Moths described in 2011
Notodontidae of South America